During the Iran–Iraq War, Iraq received large quantities of weapons and other material useful to the development of armaments and weapons of mass destruction.

Iran

Military support
Iran was backed by the Kurdish parties of KDP, and PUK, also the Islamist Kurdish Mujahideen in North Iraq, all organizations in fact rebelling against Iraqi Ba'athist government with Iranian support.

Logistic support

Iran's foreign supporters gradually came to include Syria and Libya, through which it obtained Scud missiles. It purchased large quantities of weaponry from North Korea and the People's Republic of China, notably the Silkworm anti-ship missile. It also acquired arms from Portugal, notably after 1984. It also acquired propellants and other weapons related components from Spain and Portugal. The United States also provided covert support for Iran through Israel, although it is debated as to whether U.S. President Ronald Reagan ordered the sale of weapons to Iran. Most of this support included TOW missiles.

Iraq

Military support
Iraq was supported by the People's Mujahedin of Iran, an armed group of Iranians opposing the Islamic Republic of Iran.

Logistic support
Iraq's army was primarily equipped with weaponry it had previously purchased from the Soviet Union and its satellites in the preceding decade. During the war, it also purchased billions of dollars' worth of advanced equipment from France, the People's Republic of China, Egypt, Germany and other sources. Iraq's three main suppliers of weaponry during the war were the Soviet Union followed by China and then France.  

The United States sold Iraq over $200 million in helicopters, which were used by the Iraqi military in the war. These were the only direct U.S.-Iraqi military sales. At the same time, the U.S. provided substantial covert support for Saddam Hussein. The CIA directed non-U.S. origin hardware to Saddam Hussein's armed forces, "to ensure that Iraq had sufficient military weapons, ammunition and vehicles to avoid losing the Iran-Iraq war."  And "dual use" technology was transferred from the U.S. to Iraq.

West Germany and United Kingdom also provided dual use technology that allowed Iraq to expand its missile program and radar defences.

According to an uncensored copy of Iraq's 11,000-page declaration to the U.N., leaked to Die Tageszeitung and reported by The Independent, the know-how and material for developing unconventional weapons were obtained from 150 foreign companies, from countries such as West Germany, the U.S., France, UK and China.

Iraq's main financial backers were the oil-rich Persian Gulf states, most notably Saudi Arabia ($30.9 billion), Kuwait ($8.2 billion) and the United Arab Emirates ($8 billion).

The Iraqgate scandal revealed that branch of Italy's largest bank, Banca Nazionale del Lavoro, in Atlanta, US, relying largely on U.S. taxpayer-guaranteed loans, funneled $5 billion to Iraq from 1985 to 1989.

Countries which supported either combatant

See also
Iraq–Russia relations
Iraq–United States relations
 Portugal and the Iran–Iraq War
 Italian support for Iraq during the Iran–Iraq war
 United States support for Iraq during the Iran–Iraq War

References

External links
 Stockholm International Peace Research Institute (Select "Iran" or "Iraq" as recipients from 1980 to 1988)

Iran–Iraq War
Iraq and weapons of mass destruction
Military history of Iran
Military history of Iraq
Foreign relations during the Iran–Iraq War